The 68th Annual Primetime Creative Arts Emmy Awards ceremony was held over two nights on September 10 and 11, 2016. The nominations were announced on July 14, 2016. The ceremony is in conjunction with the annual Primetime Emmy Awards and is presented in recognition of technical and other similar achievements in American television programming, including guest acting roles. The awards were announced on September 10 and 11, 2016.

Winners and nominees
Winners are listed first and highlighted in bold:

Governor's Award
 American Idol

Programs

Acting

Animation

Casting

Choreography

Cinematography

Commercial

Costumes

Directing

Hairstyling

Hosting

Interactive Media

Lighting Design / Direction

Main Title Design

Make-up

Music

Picture Editing

Production Design

Sound

Special Visual Effects

Stunt Coordination

Technical Direction

Writing

Wins by network

Programs with multiple awards

Programs with multiple nominations

References

External links
 68th Emmy Awards Nominees and Winners

068 Creative Arts
Primetime Emmy
September 2016 events in the United States
2016 in American television
2016 in Los Angeles